Armenia has participated in the Eurovision Young Dancers twice since its debut in 2003. Avetik Karapetyan participated in 2003 and Vahagn Margaryan† partipated in 2013 but neither qualified.

See also
Armenia in the Eurovision Song Contest
Armenia in the Eurovision Young Musicians

References

Countries in the Eurovision Young Dancers